A Soldier's Story is a 2015 Nigerian action drama film directed by Frankie Ogar. It had Tope Tedela, Linda Ejiofor and Daniel K Daniel in lead roles. For his role as "Bossman", Daniel K Daniel won AMAA and AMVCA awards.

Plot
The opening scenes starts with soldiers in a war torn city of a country neighbouring Nigeria. A bomb blows up after some rebels attack the soldiers.

Major Egan (Tope Tedela) sneaks out of his matrimonial bed to dress up for a military mission. Unbeknownst to him, his wife, Lebari (Adesua Etomi) was awake. After a confrontational session and later intervention of Col. Bello (Chukwuma Aligwekwe), a godfather to Lebari and an instructor to Major Egan. In a rebel camp, Bossman (Daniel K Daniel) kills two of his men for what he perceives was a "rat"-like behavior. During a search for abandoned useful materials, Regina and Angela finds a seemingly dead soldier move. Regina resorts to taking him to her house for further examination to the distaste of Angela. After some weeks of treatment and gaining consciousness, the soldier is revealed to be Major Egan but now suffering from amnesia. Bossman threatens to make Regina's brother as one of his fighters if Regina continues to advise him to change his ways. Regina and Major Egan become closer to the jealously of Angela. After a fight duel with Bossman, Major Egan recollects all the events from his previous life. After the realization that he was married, Major Egan leaves Regina for Nigeria. On arriving Lagos, he discovers his former residence is being occupied by some other persons. Afterwards, he is taken by some colleagues to Col. Bello's office, who told him that his wife was away in Abuja for a job interview. It was later revealed that Col. Bello was responsible for his proposed death on military assignment because of his intention to marry Lebari.

Angela seeks forgiveness from Regina after the revelation that she disclosed information to Bossman due to the pain she felt when Major Egan rejected her advances. She advises Regina to go to Nigeria to meet Major Egan if she's truly in love with him. In Nigeria, Col. Bello sends soldiers to assassinate Major Egan and make it appear as suicide. A gas cylinder was opened by the assassinator who revealed the death wish of Major Egan and told him Col. Bello was responsible. As the sergeant was leaving the house, stating on phone, "I have sent him to hell this time" with a bomb timer in his hands, Regina surfaced to save Major Egan for the second time saying, why do you always get yourself in death situations?.

Cast
Linda Ejiofor as Regina
Tope Tedela as Major Egan
Daniel K Daniel as Bossman
Adesua Etomi as Lebari
Zainab Balogun as Angela
Chukwuma Aligwekwe as Col. Bello
Sambasa Nzeribe as Ghetto
Olumide Oworu as Edwin

Release
It premiered at Genesis Cinemas, Onikan, Lagos State in September 2015.

Reception
36onobs.com explained in its review that the director wasted an interesting story-line on a weak screenplay. It went further to conclude that "It is difficult to equate the dissatisfaction that one feels when one sees an otherwise captivating story that ends up not realizing its potential in any art form, but this discontentment is aggravated when a motion picture director fails to make his art picturesque."

Awards

References

External links 

 

Films about amnesia
Films about military personnel
Films about missing people
Nigerian action drama films
Films set in Lagos
Films shot in Lagos
2015 action drama films